The Story of Women and Art is a television documentary series, consisting of three one-hour episodes, on the history of women artists in Europe from the Renaissance onwards, first broadcast in the United Kingdom on BBC Two in May 2014. The series is presented by Professor Amanda Vickery.

Artists featured include Properzia de' Rossi, Sofonisba Anguissola, Lavinia Fontana, Anne Seymour Damer, Angelica Kauffman, and the 17th-century Dutch paper cutter Joanna Koerten. Episode 3 covered Lady Butler, Berthe Morisot, Gertrude Jekyll, Karin Larsson, Madeleine Vionnet, and Georgia O'Keeffe.
The programme was well received by some critics, but criticized by others.

See also
 List of 20th-century women artists

References

External links
 
 BBC region 2 dvd

2014 British television series debuts
2014 British television series endings
Documentary television series about art
Western art
Women and the arts
Story of
English-language television shows
BBC television documentaries about history during the 16th and 17th centuries
BBC television documentaries about history during the 18th and 19th centuries
BBC television documentaries about history during the 20th Century